Los Algarrobos  is a corregimiento in Dolega District, Chiriquí Province, Panama. It was created by Law 43 of August 5, 2002.

References

Corregimientos of Chiriquí Province